Norberto Oconer (born 10 May 1965) is a Filipino former cyclist. He competed at the 1988 Summer Olympics and the 1992 Summer Olympics.

References

External links
 

1965 births
Living people
Filipino male cyclists
Olympic cyclists of the Philippines
Cyclists at the 1988 Summer Olympics
Cyclists at the 1992 Summer Olympics
Place of birth missing (living people)
Cyclists at the 1994 Asian Games
Asian Games competitors for the Philippines